Muneshige (written: 宗茂 or 宗鎮) is a masculine Japanese given name. Notable people with the name include:

, Japanese daimyō
, Japanese samurai and daimyō

Japanese masculine given names